Johan Sébastien Tatlot (born 26 March 1996 in Schœlcher) is a French tennis player. Tatlot has a career-high ATP singles ranking of World No. 226, achieved in September 2018. He also has an ATP career high doubles ranking of 525 achieved on 7 May 2018. Tatlot was the world no.5 junior ranked player in January 2014 and reached the 2014 Australian Open boys' doubles final.

He received a wild card to advance to the doubles main draw in the 2015 French Open with doubles partner Tristan Lamasine, losing in the first round.

Junior Grand Slam finals

Doubles: 1 (1 runner-up)

ATP Challenger and ITF Futures finals

Singles: 14 (6–8)

Doubles: 7 (2–5)

External links
 
 

1996 births
Living people
French male tennis players
Tennis players from Paris
Sportspeople from Fort-de-France
French people of Martiniquais descent